The Prussian S 6 (later DRG Class 13.10–12) was a class of German steam locomotive with a 4-4-0 wheel arrangement operated by the Prussian state railways for express train services.

Development
After the Prussian steam locomotive classes S 4 and S 5 proved less than fully satisfactory, there was a requirement in Prussia for faster and more powerful express locomotives. To that end the Head of the Locomotive Design and Procurement Department, Robert Garbe, proposed to the Locomotive Committee in 1904 a design by Linke-Hofmann of Breslau for a 4-4-0 superheated, express train locomotive. This was an evolutionary development of the Prussian Class S 4 that also had a 4-4-0 configuration.
In putting this forward, Garbe was especially keen to prove the superiority of his design compared with the four-cylinder, saturated steam, compound locomotives, particularly its predecessor, the Prussian Class S 7.

In 1905/1906 Garbe pushed through the construction of the S 6. Between 1906 and 1913 a total of 584 units were manufactured by Linke-Hofmann,  Henschel-Werke and the Maschinenbauanstalt Humboldt in Cologne. They were the last four-coupled, express locomotives to be built in Germany and, for a long time, were the most economical locomotives in the Prussian state railways.

Design features

This limitation led to the weight savings in many areas. On the first few engines, a smokebox superheater was installed, but the design this was changed during the first year in favour of a Schmidt smoke tube superheater. The long boiler was located well forward in order to spread the weight to the front carrying wheels and to keep the axle load within the maximum limits, thus giving the engine the typical appearance of a "Garbe locomotive".

The heavy balancing masses of the driving gear were badly affected by weight savings. That resulted in serious jerkiness when running. A remedy was achieved by coupling the tender closer to the locomotive and thus raising the compression of the buffer springs.

Not until the lines were upgraded in 1910 to take a  axle load, could the necessary reinforcing measures be taken. The S 6 then became the heaviest 4-4-0 locomotive on continental Europe, even outweighing the subsequently built four-cylinder, saturated steam locomotives of Class S 7.

The driver's cab was initially built with a tapered front and conical smokebox doors in order to reduce wind resistance. An unfortunate side effect of the streamlined driver's cab, however, was that the engine crew were dazzled at night by reflexions from the diagonally oriented front window panes. From 1908/1909 the cab was built with a flat front.

The locomotives were equipped with Prussian Class pr 2’2’ T 21.5 tenders.

Performance
On engines with a feedwater preheater the performance was about 10% higher.

Distribution
Apart from the divisions of Berlin and Königsberg (other sources also name Saarbrücken), the S 6 was procured by all the Prussian railway divisions S 6. There were only a few transfers.

After the First World War the S 6 was employed in express train duties (on the Leipzig–Dresden, Berlin–Dresden and other lines) as well as in passenger train services. Many of the engines were rehomed at Dresden.

Preserved locomotives
From 1912 the S 6 was ousted from heavy express train services by the S 10.

In the 1923 DRG renumbering plan for steam locomotives, 442 S 6 engines were listed for renumbering into the 13 1001 to 13 1442 series. In the third and final renumbering plan only 286 engines were listed: numbers 13 1001 to 13 1286.
The last engines in Germany were retired between 1926 and 1931.

After World War I, 81 locomotives were handed over to Poland (class Pd5), 42 to Belgium (type 66), two to Italy (class 553) and one to Lithuania as reparations.
The engines in those countries survived considerably longer in service; in Belgium they were not retired until 1956.

During the Second World War a total of 56 S 6 came back into the Reichsbahn fleet from Poland as numbers 13 501-556.

One S 6 has been preserved in Warsaw (Poland).

See also
 Prussian state railways
 List of Prussian locomotives and railcars
 List of preserved steam locomotives in Germany

References

External links

 Photo of locomotive in original configuration
 Drawing with dimensions

S 06
4-4-0 locomotives
Railway locomotives introduced in 1906
Passenger locomotives
Standard gauge locomotives of Germany
Linke-Hofmann locomotives
Henschel locomotives
Humboldt locomotives
2′B h2 locomotives